Robert Charles Clarke (1843 – 16 February 1904) was an architect based in Nottingham.

History
He was born in 1843, the son of Robert Clarke and went into business with his father to form Robert Clarke & Son.

He married Fanny Tinkler on 27 March 1882 at St Guthlac's Church, Branston, Leicestershire.

He died on 16 February 1904 at Goverton Villa, Bleasby, Nottinghamshire, and left an estate of £1,052 to his widow, Fanny Clarke.

Works
St John's Church, Worksop 1869 (with Robert Clarke)
Carlton Board Schools, Nottingham 1878
Carlton Cemetery gates, chapel and ancillary buildings 1885–1886 restoration
Holy Cross Roman Catholic Church, Carlingford Road, Hucknall 1886–1887 (now replaced)
St Mary Magdalene’s Church, Hucknall 1887–1888 restoration
St Peter’s Church, Watnall Road, Hucknall 1892 (now demolished)
St Catharine's Church, Nottingham 1895
St John’s Church, Butler's Hill, Hucknall 1895 new chancel
Mundella School (Higher Grade Centre) 1899
All Saints' Church, Nottingham 1900 Choir Vestry
Church Schools, Humber Road/Hassocks Lane, Beeston. 1900

References

19th-century English architects
Architects from Nottingham
1843 births
1904 deaths